Ranularia gallinago is a species of predatory sea snail, a marine gastropod mollusk in the family Cymatiidae.

Description

Distribution
This species occurs in the Indian Ocean off the Mascarene Basin.

References

 Drivas, J. & M. Jay (1988). Coquillages de La Réunion et de l'île Maurice

External links
 

Cymatiidae
Gastropods described in 1844